This is a list of University of Technology Sydney people, including notable alumni and staff.

Notable alumni

Academia
 Martin Bean — former vice-chancellor at the Open University and the Royal Melbourne Institute of Technology
 Anthony D. Burke — Professor of Politics and International Relations at the University of New South Wales
 Judith Beveridge — Australian poet and research supervisor at the University of Sydney
 John Croucher — Australian statistician and Professor of Management at Macquarie University
 Rosalyn Diprose — Emeritus Professor of philosophy at the University of New South Wales
 Hatice Gunes — Professor of Affective Intelligence and Robotics at the University of Cambridge
 Margaret Simons — Associate Professor of journalism at Monash University

Architecture
 Jeremy Edmiston — Australian architect
 Penelope Seidler — Australian architect

Business
 Peter Agnew — Deputy Chair of Surf Life Saving Australia
 Russell Balding — former managing director at Australian Broadcasting Corporation (ABC)
 Nina Blackwell – former senior director at Yahoo! and press secretary to former U.S. senator Hillary Clinton
 Kate Burleigh – Managing Director of Intel in Australia and New Zealand 
 Maile Carnegie – Group executive of ANZ Banking Group (ANZ) retail division and former managing director of Google Australia
 Neil Chatfield – former chairman of Virgin Australia and former non-executive director at Transurban
 Cristina Pieta Cifuentes — Economist and former board member of the Australian Energy Regulator
 Rob Coombe – Chairman of Colonial First State and former chairman of MLC Limited
 Cathryn Cox – Executive Director of Health System Planning and Investment, NSW Ministry of Health
 Jacqui Feeney – Managing Director, Fox International Channels (Australia and New Zealand)
 Mark Fitzgibbon – CEO and managing director of nib Health Funds
 Todd Greenberg — CEO of the National Rugby League
 Rachel Grimes – CFO Technology, Westpac
 Frances Hughes – former CEO of the International Council of Nurses (ICN)
 George Koukis – founder and former chairman of Temenos AG
 Ido Leffler — Israeli-Australian entrepreneur
 Geoff Lloyd – former CEO of MLC Limited
 Graeme Mason – CEO of Screen Australia
 Kim McKay — CEO of Australian Museum 
 Bettina McMahon – Executive General Manager, Government and Industry Collaboration and Adoption, Australian Digital Health Agency 
 David Murray — former CEO of the Commonwealth Bank (CBA)
 Warwick Negus – Non-executive director at Dexus and former managing director at Goldman Sachs
 Gregory Poche – founder and former chairman of StarTrack
 Davina Reichman – business consultant
 George Savvides — former managing director, Medibank
 Nicky Sparshott — CEO of Unilever Australia and New Zealand
 Vivian Wong — Group Vice President, Higher Educations at Oracle Corporation
 Jim White – Senior Vice President of Human Resources, Paramount Pictures  
 Ben Kennedy - Founder & Chief Executive Officer at Gecko
 Larry Diamond - Founder & Global Chief Executive Office at Zip. Co

Government

Politicians

Premiers of New South Wales
 Morris Iemma — former Premier of New South Wales (2005—2008)

Federal politicians
 Tanya Plibersek — Member of the House of Representatives for Sydney and former Deputy Leader of the Australian Labor Party
 Roger Price — Former member of the House of Representatives for Chifley, representing the Australian Labor Party
 Susan Templeman — Member of the House of Representatives for Macquarie, representing the Australian Labor Party
 Matt Thistlethwaite — Member of the House of Representatives for Kingsford Smith, representing the Australian Labor Party

Australian state and territory politicians
 Bryan Doyle — Australian politician
 Matt Kean — Australian politician 
 Wendy Machin — former Australian politician
 Natasha Maclaren-Jones — Australian politician
 Daniel Mookhey — Australian politician
 Marjorie O'Neill – Australian politician
 Anthony Roberts — Australian Politician 
 John Robertson — former Leader of the Labor Party in New South Wales
 Henry Tsang — former Deputy Lord Mayor of Sydney

International politicians
 Shawn Atleo — former National Chief of the Assembly of First Nations in Canada
 Sekai Holland — Zimbabwean senator

Public servants
 Michael Coutts-Trotter — director general of the NSW Department of Family and Community Services

Humanities

Arts

 Charlotte Best — Australian actress and model
 Natasha Liu Bordizzo — Australian actress and model
 Anh Do — Vietnamese-born Australian actor, author and comedian
 Genevieve Clay-Smith — Australian filmmaker
 Hugh Jackman — Australian actor, singer and producer
 Sophie Lee — Australian actor and author
 Alyssa McClelland — Australian director and actress
 James Millar — Australian actor
 Zoe Naylor — Australian actress
 Amanda Palmer — film executive 
 Chris Plummer — New Zealand film editor
 Chris Taylor — Australian performer and comedian
 Rachel Ward — Australian actress and film director
 Emma Watkins — Australian actress and The Wiggles member
 Allanah Zitserman — Australian film producer

History
 Jeannine Baker — historian and research fellow at Macquarie University

Journalism
 David Astle — Australian author, broadcaster and columnist
Jayne Azzopardi — Australian television presenter for Weekend Today & Nine News
 Brooke Boney – Entertainment reporter at Nine Network's Today show 
 Kathryn Eisman — Australian fashion and lifestyle television journalist, author and former model
 Jan Fran — Australian journalist
 Lynda Kinkade — Australian journalist and anchor at CNN
 Sonia Kruger — television presenter
 Joel Labi — news anchor and producer
 Caroline Meldrum-Hanna — Australian journalist 
 Timothy Palmer – Australian journalist at the Australian Broadcasting Corporation
 Lara Pitt — Australian television presenter and sports journalist
 Georgia Rickard — Australian travel journalist
 Karen Tso — Australian television journalist and anchor at CNBC Europe

Literature, writing and poetry
 Anna Funder — Australian writer and winner of the Miles Franklin Award
 Nikki Gemmell — Australian writer
 Kate Grenville — Australian author
 Yvette Holt – Australian poet
 Janine Shepherd — Australian author
 Vanessa Montgomery -- Australian author (Astrology)

Law
 Elizabeth Broderick — Australian Sex Discrimination Commissioner (2007—2015)
 Margaret Cunneen — deputy senior crown prosecutor of New South Wales

Sciences
 Sarah Benson — Chief forensic scientist at the Australian Federal Police
 Jordan Nguyen — Bio-medical engineer, inventor, and futurist
 Lily Serna — Australian mathematician and television presenter
 Vanessa Peterson - Australian chemist at ANSTO.

Sport
 John Allen — teacher, rugby player and cricketer
 Lachie Anderson — rugby union player
 Jo Brigden-Jones — Australian kayaker 
 Bart Bunting — former Australian skier, Salt Lake City Paralympic gold medalist
 James Chapman — former Australian rower, London Olympic silver medalist
 Pat Cummins — Australian cricketer
 Nina Curtis — Australian sailor, London Olympic silver medalist for sailing
 Claudia Gunjaca — Australian rules football  player
 Alyssa Healy — Australian cricketer
 Katie Kelly — Australian paratriathlete, Rio Olympic gold medalist
 Boyd Killingworth — rugby union player
 Adrienne Marie — former Australian volleyball player
 Rowena Morgan — former Australian volleyball player
 Alexander Purnell — Australian rower, Tokyo Olympic gold medalist
 Hayder Shkara — former Australian taekwondo athlete
 Danielle Small — former Australian soccer player
 Lucinda Whitty — Australian sailor, London Olympic silver medalist
 Gavin Woods — former Australian water polo player

Other
 Mervyn Bishop — Australian photographer

Notable staff
 Debra Adelaide — Australian novelist, writer and academic
 Philip A. Gale - British supramolecular chemist 
 Stan Grant — Australian journalist
 Nick Kaldas — Deputy commissioner of the New South Wales Police Force
 Michael Keane — American economist
 Antony Kidman — Australian psychologist and academic
 Rosetta Martiniello-Wilks — Australian cancer researcher
 Ann Moyal — Australia historian
 Jim Peacock — Australian molecular biologist 
 Göran Roos — Swedish academic and businessman
 Louise Ryan — Australian biostatistician
 Rosie Scott — Australian and New Zealand novelist
 Margaret Trask — Australian librarian 
 Helen Vatsikopoulos — Australian journalist
 Cynthia Whitchurch — Australian microbiologist 
 Mary-Anne Williams — Australian scientist
 Steve Wozniak — American electronics engineer and entrepreneur

Administration

Chancellors

Vice-Chancellors

References

External links
 UTS Alumni Association

 
Sydney, University of
University